Stratiomyini is a tribe of flies in the family Stratiomyidae.

Genera
These 26 genera belong to the tribe Stratiomyini:

 Afrodontomyia James, 1940 i c g
 Alliocera Saunders, 1845 i c g
 Anopisthocrania Lindner, 1935 i c g
 Anoplodonta James, 1936 i c g b
 Catatasis Kertesz, 1912 i c g
 Chloromelas Enderlein, 1914 i c g
 Crocutasis Lindner, 1935 i c g
 Dischizocera Lindner, 1952 i c g
 Gongroneurina Enderlein, 1933 i c g
 Hedriodiscus Enderlein, 1914 i c g b
 Hoplitimyia James, 1934 i c g b
 Metabasis Walker, 1851 i c g
 Nyassamyia Lindner, 1980 i c g
 Odontomyia Meigen, 1803 i c g b
 Oplodontha Rondani, 1863 i c g
 Pinaleus Bezzi, 1928 i c g
 Promeranisa Walker, 1854 i c g
 Psellidotus Rondani, 1864 i c g b
 Rhingiopsis Roder, 1886 i c g
 Scapanocnema Enderlein, 1914 i
 Stratiomyella James, 1953 i c g
 Stratiomys Geoffroy, 1762 i c g b
 Systegnum Enderlein, 1917 i g
 Zuerchermyia Woodley, 2001 i c g
 Zulumyia Lindner, 1952 i c g

Data sources: i = ITIS, c = Catalogue of Life, g = GBIF, b = Bugguide.net

References

Stratiomyidae
Diptera of Europe
Brachycera tribes